St. John's Episcopal Church is an historic Episcopal church located at 1105 Quarrier Street in Charleston, West Virginia, in the United States. On  November 2, 1989, it was added to the National Register of Historic Places.  It was also listed as a contributing property in the Downtown Charleston Historic District in 2006.

National Register listing
St. John's Episcopal Church ** (added 1989 - Building - #89001782)
1105 Quarrier St., Charleston
Historic Significance: 	Person, Event, Architecture/Engineering
Architect, builder, or engineer: 	Pursell, Isaac, Warne, Tucker, Silling & Hutchison
Architectural Style: 	Late Gothic Revival
Historic Person: 	Laidley, Alexander T.
Significant Year: 	1890, 1928, 1884
Area of Significance: 	Architecture, Religion
Period of Significance: 	1875–1899, 1900–1924, 1925–1949
Owner: 	Private
Historic Function: 	Religion
Historic Sub-function: 	Religious Structure
Current Function: 	Religion, Social
Current Sub-function: 	Civic, Religious Structure

Current status
St. John's Episcopal Church is an active parish in the Episcopal Diocese of West Virginia.

See also

 List of Registered Historic Places in West Virginia
 St. John's Episcopal Church (disambiguation)

References

External links

National Register listings for Kanawha County

Buildings and structures in Charleston, West Virginia
Churches in Kanawha County, West Virginia
Episcopal churches in West Virginia
Gothic Revival church buildings in West Virginia
H. Rus Warne buildings
National Register of Historic Places in Charleston, West Virginia
Churches on the National Register of Historic Places in West Virginia
Historic American Buildings Survey in West Virginia
Individually listed contributing properties to historic districts on the National Register in West Virginia